Grua is a village in the municipality of Lunner municipality, Viken, Norway. Its population (2005) is 1,477. Mining is historically important, and Norway's oldest registered iron mine (from 1538) is located here.

Villages in Oppland
Villages in Viken (county)